Okema Beach is a hamlet in the Canadian province of Saskatchewan. It is located on the shore of Emma Lake adjacent to Great Blue Heron Provincial Park.

See also 
List of communities in Saskatchewan

References 

Unincorporated communities in Saskatchewan
Lakeland No. 521, Saskatchewan
Division No. 15, Saskatchewan